James Richard Fryman (born September 23, 1935) was an American politician in the state of Kentucky. He served in the Kentucky House of Representatives as a Republican from 1980 to 1984.

References

1936 births
Living people
Republican Party members of the Kentucky House of Representatives
People from Montgomery County, Kentucky